Alex Young may refer to:
 Alex Young (athlete) (born 1994), American Olympic hammer thrower
 Alex Young (Australian footballer) (1879–1963), Australian rules footballer
 Alex Young (baseball), American baseball player
 Alex Young (basketball) (born 1989), basketball player
 Alex Young (curler), Scottish curler
 Alex Young (footballer, born 1880) (1880–1959), known as Sandy, Scottish international footballer who played for Everton
 Alex Young (footballer, born 1937) (1937–2017), known as "The Golden Vision", Scottish international footballer who played for Hearts and Everton
 Alex Young (studio executive) (born 1971), ex-husband of Kate Walsh, and co-president of production at 20th Century Fox
 Alex Young (This World Fair), musician who is a member of the popular rock band This World Fair
 Alex Young (rugby league), rugby league player

See also
 Alex Yoong (born 1976), Malaysian Chinese racing driver
 Alec Young (1925–2010), Scottish footballer
 Alexander Young (disambiguation)